This is a list of mayors and chairmen of the City of Prahran, a former local government area in  Melbourne, Victoria, Australia and its precedents. It existed from 1854 until 1994 when it merged with the City of Malvern to form the new City of Stonnington.

Council name

Prahran chairmen (1856–1863)

Prahran mayors (1863–1994)

Stonnington City mayors (from 1996)

See also
Prahran Town Hall
List of mayors of Malvern
List of mayors of Stonnington

External links
Stonnington City Council

References
Prahran Chairmen, Mayors and Councillors

Prahran
Mayors Prahran